Wilbur "Biggs" Wehde (November 23, 1906 – September 21, 1970) was an American Major League Baseball pitcher who played in  and  with the Chicago White Sox. He batted and threw right-handed.

Biography 
Wehde was born November 23, 1906 and grew up on an eleven-acre dairy farm on the edge of Holstein, Iowa, where is father operated a small creamery. He was the eldest of five children born to Gus and Frieda Suiter Wehde. His half brothers, twins Ray and Roy Wehde, the youngest of four children born to Gus and Anna Christopherson Wehde, were basketball players at Holstein High School and Iowa State University.

He played minor league baseball for the Sioux City Cowboys and the Dubuque Tigers of the Mississippi Valley League before joining the White Sox in September 15, 1930 at the age of 23. Wehde would go on to make twelve appearances for Chicago, all in relief, during 1930 and 1931.

Biggs served as a Specialist 3 in the U.S. Navy during World War II.

He died on September 21, 1970 at the age of 63, in Sioux Falls, South Dakota and is buried in Calvary Cemetery, Sioux City, Iowa.

References

External links

1906 births
1970 deaths
Major League Baseball pitchers
Baseball players from Iowa
Chicago White Sox players
People from Ida County, Iowa